The udu is a plosive aerophone (in this case implosive) and an idiophone of the Igbo of Nigeria. In the Igbo language, ùdù means 'vessel'. Actually being a water jug with an additional hole, it was played by Igbo women for ceremonial uses. Usually the udu is made of clay. The instrument is played by hand. The player produces a bass sound by quickly hitting the big hole. There are many ways that the pitches can be changed, depending on how the hand above the small upper hole is positioned. Furthermore, the whole corpus can be played by fingers. Today it is widely used by percussionists in different music styles.

Derived instruments

Several instruments, traditional and modern, are derived from the udu. These include the utar, in which the udu is elongated, flatter, and disc-like; the kim-kim which has two chambers and two holes; and the zarbang-udu which adds a skin membrane along with the open holes, developed by Persian percussionist Benham Samani. The membrane and the holes can be played with one or two hands at the same time. This is a hand percussion instrument.

See also
Botija 
Ghatam

References 

African percussion instruments
Igbo musical instruments
Nigerian musical instruments
Plosive aerophones
Struck idiophones played by hand